Finding Nemo is a 2003 American computer-animated comedy-drama adventure film produced by Pixar Animation Studios for Walt Disney Pictures. Directed by Andrew Stanton with co-direction by Lee Unkrich, the screenplay was written by Stanton, Bob Peterson, and David Reynolds from a story by Stanton. The film stars the voices of Albert Brooks, Ellen DeGeneres, Alexander Gould, Willem Dafoe, and Geoffrey Rush. It  tells the story of an overprotective clownfish named Marlin (Brooks) who, along with a regal blue tang named Dory (DeGeneres), searches for his missing son Nemo (Gould). Along the way, Marlin learns to take risks and comes to terms with Nemo taking care of himself.

Pre-production of the film began in early 1997. The inspiration for Finding Nemo sprang from multiple experiences, going back to Stanton's childhood, when he loved going to the dentist to see the fish tank, assuming that the fish were from the ocean and wanted to go home. To ensure that the movements of the fish in the film were believable, the animators took a crash course in fish biology and oceanography. Thomas Newman composed the score for the film.

Premiering in Los Angeles on May 18, Finding Nemo was released in theaters in the United States on May 30, 2003. Upon its release, it received widespread acclaim from critics, who praised the visual elements, screenplay and characters that has been cited as funny to both young moviegoers and their parents. It also became the highest-grossing animated film at the time of its release, and was the second-highest-grossing film of 2003, earning a total of $871 million worldwide by the end of its initial theatrical run. The film was also nominated for three Academy Awards, winning one for Best Animated Feature, becoming the first Pixar film to do so.

Finding Nemo is the best-selling DVD title of all time, with over 40 million copies sold , and was the highest-grossing G-rated film of all time before Pixar's own Toy Story 3 overtook it. The film was re-released in 3D in 2012. In 2008, the American Film Institute named it as the 10th greatest American animated film as part of their 10 Top 10 lists. A sequel, Finding Dory, was released in June 2016.

Plot

Clownfish Marlin lives in an anemone in the Great Barrier Reef with his mate, Coral, and their eggs. After Coral and nearly all the eggs are eaten by a barracuda, Marlin becomes overprotective of his son Nemo, born of one remaining egg. While Marlin talks to Nemo's teacher on the latter's first day of school, Nemo approaches a speedboat, where a pair of scuba divers capture him. Marlin pursues the boat in vain and meets Dory, a blue tang with acute short-term memory loss, who offers her help. The two encounter Bruce, Anchor, and Chum, three sharks who have sworn to abstain from eating fish. Marlin finds a diver's mask that fell from the boat, accidentally hitting Dory and giving her a nosebleed. The scent of her blood sends Bruce into a feeding frenzy, but the sharks flee after accidentally setting off old naval mines, which knock Marlin and Dory unconscious.

Nemo is placed in an aquarium in the office of dentist Philip Sherman in Sydney. He meets the "Tank Gang" led by Gill, a Moorish idol. The Tank Gang tell Nemo that he is to be given to Sherman's niece Darla, who killed her previous fish. Gill decides to help Nemo and devises an escape plan: Nemo can fit inside the aquarium's filter tube and must block it with a pebble, obliging Sherman to put the fish into plastic bags while he cleans the tank, and allow them to roll out the window and into the harbor. Nemo attempts to place the pebble, but fails and is almost killed.

Marlin and Dory awaken, but the mask falls into a deep trench. Descending after the mask, they are soon pursued by an anglerfish. Dory memorizes the address on the goggles and they escape. The two disregard directions from a school of moonfish, taking what Marlin believes is a safer route. After being stung by a forest of jellyfish, they are knocked unconscious and awaken in the East Australian Current with a group of sea turtles, including Crush and his son, Squirt. The story of Marlin's quest is relayed across the ocean to Sydney, where a pelican named Nigel tells the Tank Gang. Nemo then succeeds in blocking the filter and soon the aquarium is covered in green algae.

Marlin and Dory exit the East Australian Current and are consumed by a blue whale which expels them through its blowhole in Sydney Harbour. Nigel helps them escape a flock of seagulls ("rats with wings") and takes them to the dentist's office. Sherman has foiled the Tank Gang with a new high-tech filter. When Darla arrives, Nemo plays dead and Nigel terrifies Darla, throwing the office into chaos. Sherman throws out Nigel along with Marlin and Dory, with the former believing that Nemo is dead. Gill helps Nemo escape through a drain leading to the ocean.

Marlin bids farewell to Nigel and Dory and begins his journey home. Nemo meets Dory but she does not remember him until her memory returns when she reads the word "Sydney" on a drainpipe. Dory reunites Nemo with Marlin, but a fishing trawler captures her in a net along with a school of groupers. With his father's blessing, Nemo enters the net, and he and Marlin instruct all of the fish to swim down. Their combined force breaks the net. Returning home to the reef, Marlin is more confident, while Dory has remained friends with Bruce, Anchor, and Chum. Marlin and Dory watch Nemo off as he goes to school. Meanwhile, after the dentist's filter breaks,  the Tank Gang escapes into Sydney Harbour after being placed in bags. Still stuck in the bags, they ponder what to do next.

Voice cast

Production

Development

The inspiration for Finding Nemo sprang from multiple experiences, going back to director Andrew Stanton's childhood, when he loved going to the dentist to see the fish tank, assuming that the fish were from the ocean and wanted to go home. In 1992, shortly after his son was born, he and his family took a trip to Six Flags Discovery Kingdom (which was called Marine World at the time). There, after seeing the shark tube and various exhibits, he felt that the underwater world could be done beautifully in computer animation. Later, in 1997, he took his son for a walk in the park but realized that he was overprotecting him and lost an opportunity to have a father-son experience that day.

In an interview with National Geographic magazine, Stanton said that the idea for the characters of Marlin and Nemo came from a photograph of two clownfish peeking out of an anemone:

In addition, clownfish are colorful, but do not tend to come out of an anemone often. For a character who has to go on a dangerous journey, Stanton felt a clownfish was the perfect type of fish for the character. Pre-production of the film began in early 1997. Stanton began writing the screenplay during the post-production of A Bug's Life. As a result, Finding Nemo began production with a complete screenplay, something that co-director Lee Unkrich called "very unusual for an animated film". The artists took scuba diving lessons to study the coral reef.

Stanton originally planned to use flashbacks to reveal how Coral died but realized that by the end of the film there would be nothing to reveal, deciding to show how she died at the beginning of the movie. The character of Gill also was different from the character seen in the final film. In a scene that was eventually deleted, Gill tells Nemo that he's from a place called Bad Luck Bay and that he has brothers and sisters in order to impress the young clownfish, only for the latter to find out that he was lying by listening to a patient reading a children's storybook that shares exactly the same details.

Casting
William H. Macy was the first actor cast as Marlin. Although Macy had recorded most of the dialogue, Stanton felt that the character needed a lighter touch. Stanton then cast Albert Brooks in the role, and in his opinion, it "saved" the film. Brooks liked the idea of Marlin being this clownfish who isn't funny and recorded outtakes of telling very bad jokes.

The idea for the initiation sequence came from a story conference between Stanton and Bob Peterson while they were driving to record the actors. Although he originally envisioned the character of Dory as male, Stanton was inspired to cast Ellen DeGeneres when he watched an episode of Ellen in which he saw her "change the subject five times before finishing one sentence". The pelican character named Gerald (who in the final film ends up swallowing and choking on Marlin and Dory) was originally a friend of Nigel. They were going to play against each other with Nigel being neat and fastidious and Gerald being scruffy and sloppy. The filmmakers could not find an appropriate scene for them that did not slow the pace of the picture, so Gerald's character was minimized.

Stanton himself provided the voice of Crush the sea turtle. He originally did the voice for the film's story reel and assumed they would find an actor later. When Stanton's performance became popular in test screenings, he decided to keep his performance in the film. He recorded all his dialogue while lying on a sofa in Unkrich's office. Crush's son Squirt was voiced by Nicholas Bird, the young son of fellow Pixar director Brad Bird. According to Stanton, the elder Bird was playing a tape recording of his young son around the Pixar studios one day. Stanton felt the voice was "this generation's Thumper" and immediately cast Nicholas.

Megan Mullally was originally going to provide a voice in the film. According to Mullally, the producers were stunned to learn that the voice of her character Karen Walker on the television show Will & Grace was not her natural speaking voice. The producers hired her anyway, and then strongly encouraged her to use her Karen Walker voice for the role. When Mullally refused, she was dismissed.

Animation
To ensure that the movements of the fish in the film were believable, the animators took a crash course in fish biology and oceanography. They visited aquariums, went diving in Hawaii, and received in-house lectures from an ichthyologist. As a result, Pixar's animator for Dory, Gini Cruz Santos, integrated "the fish movement, human movement, and facial expressions to make them look and feel like real characters." Production designer Ralph Eggleston created pastel drawings to give the lighting crew led by Sharon Calahan ideas of how every scene in the film should be lit.

The Great white shark, Bruce, is in reference to the animatronic shark used in the Universal film Jaws. The shark they had used on set was nicknamed "Bruce" after Bruce Raiman, who was Steven Spielberg's divorce lawyer. The line "Here's Brucey!" is a reference to the Jack Nicholson line from the 1980 horror film, The Shining. Additionally, the music that the dentist's niece Darla plays is the theme music from the 1960 Alfred Hitchcock film, Psycho.

The film was dedicated to Glenn McQueen, a Pixar animator who died of melanoma in October 2002. Finding Nemo shares many plot elements with Pierrot the Clownfish, a children's book published in 2002, but allegedly conceived in 1995. The author, Franck Le Calvez, sued Disney for infringement of his intellectual rights and to bar Finding Nemo merchandise in France. The judge ruled against him, citing the color differences between Pierrot and Nemo.

Localization 

In 2016, Disney Character Voices International's senior vice president Rick Dempsey, in collaboration with the Navajo Nation Museum, created a Navajo dubbing of the movie titled Nemo Há’déést’íí which was released in theaters March 18–24 of the same year. The project was thought as a means to preserve Navajo language, teaching the language to kids through a Disney movie. The studio held auditions on the reservation, but finding an age-appropriate native speaker to voice Nemo was hard, Dempsey said, as the majority of native Navajo speakers are over 40 years old. The end credits version of the song Beyond the Sea, covered in the English version by Robbie Williams, was also adapted into Navajo, with Fall Out Boy's lead singer Patrick Stump performing it. Finding Nemo was the second movie to receive a Navajo dubbing: in 2013, a Navajo version of Star Wars was created.

Soundtrack
Finding Nemo was the first Pixar film not to be scored by Randy Newman. The original soundtrack album was instead scored by Thomas Newman, his cousin, and released on May 20, 2003. The score was nominated for the Academy Award for Original Score, losing to The Lord of the Rings: The Return of the King.

Release

Marketing
Disney released a teaser trailer of Finding Nemo in September 2002 on the Monsters, Inc. home video releases. The teaser was later released online, and was attached to theatrical screenings of The Santa Clause 2. Trailers for the film were later attached to the home video releases of Treasure Planet, Beauty and the Beast: Belle's Magical World and other Disney films. There were also TV spots that shared “Fishy Facts” about sharks, turtles and pelicans. One of these ads, particularly the one about sharks, can be found on the second disc of the Collector's Edition DVD release of A Bug's Life, which was released three days before the film's release on May 27, 2003.

McDonald's restaurants began to sell eight Happy Meal toys based on the film. At the 100th North American International Toy Fair event in New York City, Hasbro unveiled a variety of Finding Nemo toys. A cereal themed to the film was released by Kellogg's, consisting of naturally sweetened oats with fish-shaped marshmallows. Finding Nemo was advertised as promotional partners on other companies, like Frito-Lay, Keebler, Pepsi, Ralphs, Dreyer's, Jel Sert, Airheads, Orville Redenbacher's and THQ. Before May 26, 2003, stickers on over 50 million bags of potato chips alerted consumers to a sweepstakes dangling a trip for four to Sydney, Australia with a visit to the Great Barrier Reef. On May 17, 2003, Frito-Lay hosted an event at each of the Walmart stores, where kids could use 3D goggles to find hidden images of Nemo. Kellogg's packed eight different water toys depicting film characters inside Frosted Flakes, Rice Krispies, Honey Smacks and Cocoa Rice Krispies cereal boxes. The Honey Smacks, Frosted Flakes, Cinnamon Crunch Crispix and Froot Loops boxes also carried a Nemo memory card game on back panels. Plus, a Nemo-themed Marshmallow Froot Loops cereal featured four of the film's characters. Consumers could mail in two UPCs from the three Kellogg's cereals to receive a large beach towel. Besides this, the company unveiled a new type of Pop-Tarts inspired by Finding Nemo. Known as the Great Berry Reef Pop-Tarts, they had a wild berry filling and fish sprinkles. A pool raft was available with two Pop-Tart UPCs and shipping, handled by Draft Worldwide of Chicago. Eggo waffles would offer holographic swimming goggles with the purchase of two of its products with shipping and handling. For their snacks division, Kellogg's offered consumers who purchased two packages of select products and two gallons of milk with a giant inflatable shark. The company advertised the film on Vanilla Wafers, Chips Deluxe, Mini Fudge Shoppe Fudge Stripes, Soft Batch Chocolate Chip Cookies, Rice Krispies Treats and limited edition Nemo-themed cookies.

On May 20, 2003, Kellogg's recalled Frosted Flakes cereal boxes due to their extremely close resemblance of a Hasbro memory card game. A lawsuit was filed against the company, which included a full-page reproduction of the front of a Frosted Flakes box with the cereal's familiar Tony the Tiger mascot grinning next to Nemo, Dory & Crush from the film. Disney had licensed the characters to use on the game cards. Hasbro had filed the suit to protect its trademark against blatant infringement.

Theatrical
Finding Nemo was not only the fifth Pixar film, but was also the first one to be released during the summer instead of November, much like its four predecessors. The film premiered in Los Angeles on May 18, 2003, and opened in theaters with The Italian Job and Wrong Turn on May 30, 2003.

Home media
Finding Nemo was released on VHS and DVD on November 4, 2003. The DVD release sold more than 8 million copies on the first day of release, taking Spider-Mans record for having the highest single-day DVD sales. It also surpassed Monsters, Inc. for having the highest single-day record for an animated movie. Within two weeks, it went on to become the best-selling DVD of its time, selling over 15 million copies and beating The Lord of the Rings: The Fellowship of the Ring. With over 40 million copies sold, Finding Nemo currently holds the record for the best-selling DVD release of all time. This DVD consists of two separate discs direct from the digital source. The first disc features a widescreen version (1.78:1 aspect ratio) and the second disc features a fullscreen version (family-friendly 1.33:1 aspect ratio without pan and scan). Both discs feature an introduction in the main menu, fish icons in the corner of the menus that transform the screen into a virtual aquarium and are THX certified. On the first disc, the menus take place in the ocean and bonus features include the in-depth documentary Making Nemo, visual commentary with deleted scenes and design galleries. As for the second disc, the menus take place at the dentist office. There are sneak peeks for The Incredibles, Home on the Range, The Lion King 1½ and other upcoming film releases. Bonus features on this disc include Knick Knack, an original 1989 short film, Exploring the Reef, Mr. Ray's Encyclopedia, a guessing game called Fisharades, Storytime and behind-the-scenes with character interviews, studio tour and publicity. Both Exploring the Reef and Knick Knack can also be selected in the main menu.

The film was then released on both Blu-ray 3D and Blu-ray on December 4, 2012, with both a 3-disc and a 5-disc set. In 2019, Finding Nemo was released on 4K Ultra HD Blu-ray.

Reception

Box office

Original theatrical run
During its original theatrical run, Finding Nemo grossed $339.7 million in the United States and Canada and $531.3 million in other territories, for a worldwide total of $871.0 million. It was the second-highest-grossing film of 2003. Finding Nemo also defeated The Matrix Reloaded to become the highest-grossing film of the 2003 summer season. The film sold an estimated 56.4 million tickets in the United States during its initial theatrical run.

On its opening weekend, Finding Nemo earned $70.6 million in the United States and Canada. When the film opened, it was ranked number one at the box office, dethroning Bruce Almighty. Additionally, it surpassed its predecessor Monsters, Inc. for having the highest domestic opening weekend for an animated film. It would hold this record until Shrek 2 took it the following year. During its second weekend, the film dropped to second place behind 2 Fast 2 Furious. Nevertheless, the film returned to the number one spot the following week. At that point, it earned $29.2 million, bringing the total domestic gross to $192.3 million. Finding Nemo was the first film to reclaim the number one spot since Die Another Day and Harry Potter and the Chamber of Secrets in 2002. It would also outgross the weaker openings of Rugrats Go Wild, Hollywood Homicide and Dumb and Dumberer: When Harry Met Lloyd. By the film's 20th day of release, Finding Nemo had earned over $200 million. During the film's fourth weekend, it was overtaken by Hulk.

By July 2003, Finding Nemo had earned $274.9 million, beating The Matrix Reloaded and becoming the top-grossing movie of the year. The film even surpassed Shrek to become the second highest-grossing animated film. Later that month, the film had earned over $300 million becoming the highest-grossing animated film in the United States and Canada, surpassing The Lion King. By the end of the summer season, Finding Nemo was one of five films to reach $200 million at the box office in a single summer season, with the others being X2, The Matrix Reloaded, Bruce Almighty and Pirates of the Caribbean: The Curse of the Black Pearl. At the end of its theatrical run, Finding Nemo grossed $339.7 million in the United States and Canada and $531.3 million in international territories, totaling $871.0 million worldwide. In all three occasions, it had outgrossed The Lion King to become the highest-grossing animated film. It stayed in the Top 10 until August 14 (11 weeks total). In North America, it was surpassed by both Shrek 2 in 2004 and Toy Story 3 in 2010. Finding Nemo would hold the record for having the highest international gross for an animated film until 2009 when it was taken by Ice Age: Dawn of the Dinosaurs. Outside North America, it stands as the fifth highest-grossing animated film. Worldwide, it currently ranks as the ninth highest-grossing animated film. Moreover, it was the highest-grossing Disney film for three years before Pirates of the Caribbean: Dead Man's Chest surpassed it.

The film had impressive box office runs in many international markets. In Japan, its highest-grossing market after North America, it grossed ¥11.2 billion ($102.4 million), becoming the highest-grossing foreign animated film in local currency (yen). It has only been surpassed by Frozen (¥25.5 billion). Following in biggest grosses are the U.K., Ireland and Malta, where it grossed £37.2 million ($67.1 million), France and the Maghreb region ($64.8 million), Germany ($53.9 million), and Spain ($29.5 million).

3D re-release
After the success of the 3D re-release of The Lion King, Disney re-released Finding Nemo in 3D on September 14, 2012, with a conversion cost estimated to be below $5 million. For the opening weekend of its 3D re-release in North America, Finding Nemo grossed $16.7 million, debuting at the No. 2 spot behind Resident Evil: Retribution. The film earned $41.1 million in North America and $28.2 million internationally, for a combined total of $69.3 million, and a cumulative worldwide total of $940.3 million.

Critical response
The website's consensus reads, "Breathtakingly lovely and grounded by the stellar efforts of a well-chosen cast, Finding Nemo adds another beautifully crafted gem to Pixar's crown." Metacritic (which uses a weighted average) assigned the film a score of 90 out of 100 based on 38 reviews, indicating "universal acclaim". Audiences polled by CinemaScore gave the film a rare average grade of "A+" on an A+ to F scale.

Roger Ebert gave the film four out of four stars, calling it "one of those rare movies where I wanted to sit in the front row and let the images wash out to the edges of my field of vision". Ed Park of The Village Voice gave the film a positive review, saying "It's an ocean of eye candy that tastes fresh even in this ADD-addled era of SpongeBob SquarePants." Mark Caro of the Chicago Tribune gave the film four out of four stars, saying "You connect to these sea creatures as you rarely do with humans in big-screen adventures. The result: a true sunken treasure." Hazel-Dawn Dumpert of LA Weekly gave the film a positive review, saying "As gorgeous a film as Disney's ever put out, with astonishing qualities of light, movement, surface and color at the service of the best professional imaginations money can buy." Jeff Strickler of the Star Tribune gave the film a positive review, saying it "proves that even when Pixar is not at the top of its game, it still produces better animation than some of its competitors on their best days." Gene Seymour of Newsday gave the film three-and-a-half stars out of four, saying "The underwater backdrops take your breath away. No, really. They're so lifelike, you almost feel like holding your breath while watching." Rene Rodriguez of the Miami Herald gave the film four out of four stars, saying "Parental anxiety may not be the kind of stuff children's films are usually made of, but this perfectly enchanting movie knows how to cater to its kiddie audience without condescending to them."

Kenneth Turan of the Los Angeles Times gave the film three-and-a-half out of five, saying "The best break of all is that Pixar's traditionally untethered imagination can't be kept under wraps forever, and "Nemo" erupts with sea creatures that showcase Stanton and company's gift for character and peerless eye for skewering contemporary culture." Stephen Holden of The New York Times gave the film four out of five stars, saying "Visual imagination and sophisticated wit raise Finding Nemo to a level just below the peaks of Pixar's Toy Story movies and Monsters, Inc.." Terry Lawson of the Detroit Free Press gave the film three out of four, saying "As we now expect from Pixar, even the supporting fish in "Finding Nemo" are more developed as characters than any human in the Mission: Impossible movies." Claudia Puig of USA Today gave the film three and half out of four, saying "Finding Nemo is an undersea treasure. The most gorgeous of all the Pixar films—which include Toy Story 1 and 2, A Bug's Life and Monsters, Inc.—Nemo treats family audiences to a sweet, resonant story and breathtaking visuals. It may lack Monsters, Inc.s clever humor, but kids will identify with the spunky sea fish Nemo, and adults will relate to Marlin, Nemo's devoted dad." Bruce Westbrook of the Houston Chronicle gave the film an A−, saying "Finding Nemo lives up to Pixar's high standards for wildly creative visuals, clever comedy, solid characters and an involving story." Tom Long of The Detroit News gave the film an A−, saying "A simple test of humanity: If you don't laugh aloud while watching it, you've got a battery not a heart."

Lou Lumenick of the New York Post gave the film four out of four, saying "A dazzling, computer-animated fish tale with a funny, touching script and wonderful voice performances that make it an unqualified treat for all ages." Moira MacDonald of The Seattle Times gave the film four out of four, saying "Enchanting; written with an effortless blend of sweetness and silliness, and animated with such rainbow-hued beauty, you may find yourself wanting to freeze-frame it." Daphne Gordon of the Toronto Star gave the film four out of five, saying "One of the strongest releases from Disney in years, thanks to the work of Andrew Stanton, possibly one of the most successful directors you've never heard of." Ty Burr of The Boston Globe gave the film three and a half out of four, saying "Finding Nemo isn't quite up there with the company's finest work—there's finally a sense of formula setting in—but it's hands down the best family film since Monsters, Inc." C.W. Nevius of The San Francisco Chronicle gave the film four out of four, saying "The visuals pop, the fish emote and the ocean comes alive. That's in the first two minutes. After that, they do some really cool stuff." Ann Hornaday of The Washington Post gave the film a positive review, saying "Finding Nemo will engross kids with its absorbing story, brightly drawn characters and lively action, and grown-ups will be equally entertained by the film's subtle humor and the sophistication of its visuals." David Ansen of Newsweek gave the film a positive review, saying "A visual marvel, every frame packed to the gills with clever details, Finding Nemo is the best big-studio release so far this year."

Richard Corliss of Time gave the film a positive review, saying "Nemo, with its ravishing underwater fantasia, manages to trump the design glamour of earlier Pixar films." Lisa Schwarzbaum of Entertainment Weekly gave the film an A, saying "In this seamless blending of technical brilliance and storytelling verve, the Pixar team has made something as marvelously soulful and innately, fluidly American as jazz." Carrie Rickey of The Philadelphia Inquirer gave the film three out of four, saying "As eye-popping as Nemo's peepers and as eccentric as this little fish with asymmetrical fins." David Germain of the Associated Press gave the film a positive review, saying "Finding Nemo is laced with smart humor and clever gags, and buoyed by another cheery story of mismatched buddies: a pair of fish voiced by Albert Brooks and Ellen DeGeneres." Anthony Lane of The New Yorker gave the film a positive review, saying "The latest flood of wizardry from Pixar, whose productions, from Toy Story onward, have lent an indispensable vigor and wit to the sagging art of mainstream animation." The 3D re-release prompted a retrospective on the film nine years after its initial release. Stephen Whitty of The Star-Ledger described it as "a genuinely funny and touching film that, in less than a decade, has established itself as a timeless classic." On the 3D re-release, Lisa Schwarzbaum of Entertainment Weekly wrote that its emotional power was deepened by "the dimensionality of the oceanic deep" where "the spatial mysteries of watery currents and floating worlds are exactly where 3D explorers were born to boldly go".

Finding Nemo was included on a number of best-of lists. The film appeared on professional rankings from BBC and The Independent based on retrospective appraisal, as one of the greatest films of the twenty-first century. Several publications have listed it as one of the best animated films, including: IGN (2010), Insider, USA Today, Elle (all 2018), Parade, Complex, and Time Out New York (all 2021). In December 2021, the film's screenplay was listed number 60 on the Writers Guild of America's "101 Greatest Screenplays of the 21st Century (So Far)".

Accolades

Finding Nemo won the Academy Award and Saturn Award for Best Animated Film. It also won the award for Best Animated Film at the Kansas City Film Critics Circle Awards, the Las Vegas Film Critics Society Awards, the National Board of Review Awards, the Online Film Critics Society Awards, and the Toronto Film Critics Association Awards. The film received many other awards, including: Kids Choice Awards for Favorite Movie and Favorite Voice from an Animated Movie (Ellen DeGeneres), and the Saturn Award for Best Supporting Actress (Ellen DeGeneres).

The film was also nominated for two Chicago Film Critics Association Awards, for Best Picture and Best Supporting Actress (Ellen DeGeneres), a Golden Globe Award for Best Motion Picture – Musical or Comedy, and two MTV Movie Awards, for Best Movie and Best Comedic Performance (Ellen DeGeneres).

In June 2008, the American Film Institute revealed its "Ten Top Ten", the best 10 films in 10 "classic" American film genres, after polling over 1,500 people from the creative community. Finding Nemo was acknowledged as the 10th best film in the animation genre. It was the most recently released film among all 10 lists, and one of only three movies made after the year 2000 (the others being The Lord of the Rings: The Fellowship of the Ring and Shrek).

American Film Institute recognition:
 AFI's 100 Years...100 Movies – Nominated
 AFI's 10 Top 10 – No. 10 Animated film

Environmental concerns and consequences
The film's use of clownfish prompted mass purchase of the fish breed as pets in the United States, even though the story portrayed the use of fish as pets negatively and suggested that saltwater aquariums are notably tricky and expensive to maintain. The demand for clownfish was supplied by large-scale harvesting of tropical fish in regions like Vanuatu. The Australian Tourism Commission (ATC) launched several marketing campaigns in China and the United States to improve tourism in Australia, many of them utilizing Finding Nemo clips. Queensland used Finding Nemo to draw tourists to promote itself to vacationers. According to National Geographic, "Ironically, Finding Nemo, a movie about the anguish of a captured clownfish, caused home-aquarium demand for them to triple."

The reaction to the film by the general public has led to environmental devastation for the clownfish, and has provoked an outcry from several environmental protection agencies, including the Marine Aquarium Council, Australia. The demand for tropical fish skyrocketed after the film's release, causing reef species decimation in Vanuatu and several other reef areas. After seeing the film, some aquarium owners released their pet fish into the ocean, but failed to release them into the correct oceanic habitat, which introduced species that are harmful to the indigenous environment, a practice that is harming reefs worldwide.

Legacy

Sequel

A spin-off sequel to this film was released in June 2016, titled Finding Dory. It focuses on Dory having a journey to reunite with her parents (Diane Keaton and Eugene Levy). Like the previous film, Finding Dory was a financial success and fared well with critics.

Video games

A video game based on the film was released in 2003, for Microsoft Windows, Xbox, PlayStation 2, GameCube, and Game Boy Advance. The goal of the game is to complete different levels under the roles of Nemo, Marlin or Dory. It includes cut scenes from the movie, and each clip is based on a level. It was also the last Pixar game developed by Traveller's Tales. Upon release, the game received mixed reviews. A Game Boy Advance sequel, titled Finding Nemo: The Continuing Adventures, was released in 2004.

Theme park attractions
Finding Nemo has inspired numerous attractions and properties at Disney Parks around the world, including: Turtle Talk with Crush, which opened in 2004 at Epcot, 2005 in Disney California Adventure Park, 2008 in Hong Kong Disneyland, and 2009 in Tokyo DisneySea; Finding Nemo Submarine Voyage, which opened in 2007 in Disneyland Park; The Seas with Nemo & Friends, which opened in 2007 at Epcot; Finding Nemo – The Musical, which opened in 2007 in Disney's Animal Kingdom; and Crush's Coaster, which opened in 2007 at Walt Disney Studios Park.

Notes

References

External links

  from Disney
  from Pixar
 
 
 
 

 
2003 computer-animated films
2003 films
2000s American animated films
3D animated films
3D re-releases
American 3D films
American computer-animated films
American animated feature films
Animated films about fish
Best Animated Feature Academy Award winners
Best Animated Feature Annie Award winners
Best Animated Feature Broadcast Film Critics Association Award winners
2000s English-language films
Films scored by Thomas Newman
Films directed by Andrew Stanton
Films set in Sydney
Films with screenplays by Andrew Stanton
Pixar animated films
Walt Disney Pictures animated films
Films about father–son relationships
Films about parenting